Jean-Auguste-Dominique Ingres (1780–1867) was a French painter.

Ingres may also refer to:

Ingres (database)
Rémi Ingres (b. 1969), French speed skater
Ingres paper, a type of drawing paper

See also

Musée Ingres